Ratloop, Inc. is an American video game developer based in Houston, Texas, and founded in 1997 in Richmond, Virginia. In addition to traditional retail game products, Ratloop has also done contract work for various 3D multimedia projects such as training tools and "serious games". Their earliest work used the label "Team Epochalypse", and they also own the DBA brand "Mekada", which is oriented towards casual gamers. In 2007, Ratloop Asia Pte. Ltd. was incorporated to support a development team based in Singapore. In 2017, Ratloop Canada was incorporated.

Notable projects 
 Malice (Quantum Axcess, 1997) - A commercially released total conversion for Quake.
 Snap-on Gearhead Garage (Head Games Publishing, 1999) - Original game allowing players to customize and repair cars.
 Rocketbirds: Revolution - a 2D cinematic action-adventure puzzler game made with Adobe Flash.
Helsing's Fire (2010): a puzzle video game for iOS.
Rocketbirds: Hardboiled Chicken (2011) - An action game for PlayStation Network and PC. PC version published by Reverb Publishing.
Rocketbirds 2: Evolution (2016) - An action game for Microsoft Windows, PlayStation 4 and PlayStation Vita.
VROOM KABOOM (2018) - A free-to-play Tower Defense with vehicles game for PlayStation 4 and Steam.

References

External links 
 

Video game companies of the United States
Video game development companies
Ratloop games